The Zenica massacre happened on 19 April 1993, approximately about noon.

Attack
At the time (19 April 1993), there was significant commercial activity in the center of the city, with about two to three thousand men, women and children in the area ultimately hit by grenades.

The exact number of grenades shot at the center of Zenica is not known yet though estimates place the number at nine grenades shot from howitzer. A total of six grenades hit the target, three series of two. The first attack began at about 12:10 local time, the second one with two grenades at 12:24, and the following two rounds with two grenades total at 12:29.

Aftermath
ICTY charged HVO's general Tihomir Blaškić for the crime. There are two different claims about source of the fire: charge in the Blaškić process claims there were HVO's positions in Putićevo, while defence claimed that shelling perpetrator were Serbian forces from mountain Vlašić.

The Trial Chamber acquitted general Blaškić of all accusations on counts of the charge by which he was accused for the crime.

Memorial park

Also, the date of massacre is commemorated as a civilian victims' day of Bosnian War in Zenica.

See also
 Bosnian genocide
 Croatian war crimes in the Yugoslav Wars
 List of massacres in the Bosnian War
 Velika Broda massacre

References

External links
Photo 1 of the city square after the attack
Photo 2 of the city square after the attack

Massacres in 1993
Massacres in the Bosnian War
Croatian war crimes in the Bosnian War
1993 in Bosnia and Herzegovina
April 1993 events in Europe
Conflicts in 1993
Massacres of Bosniaks